Omroep Gelderland (in English: Gelderland Broadcasting) is a regional public broadcaster for the Dutch province of Gelderland. Omroep Gelderland has its own radio station, Radio Gelderland, and TV channel, TV Gelderland, broadcasting primarily for the province itself.

See also
 Netherlands Public Broadcasting
 Television in the Netherlands

References

External links
 Omroep Gelderland website  (Mobile) 

Netherlands Public Broadcasting
Dutch-language television networks
Mass media in Arnhem